Christine Love may refer to:

 Christine Love (singer), Filipina singer
 Christine Love (writer), Canadian writer